Robert D. Booker (July 11, 1920 – April 9, 1943) was a United States Army soldier and a recipient of the United States military's highest decoration—the Medal of Honor—for his actions in World War II.

Biography
Booker joined the army from his birthplace of Callaway, Nebraska in June 1942, and by April 9, 1943, was serving as a private in the 133rd Infantry Regiment, 34th Infantry Division. On that day, near Fondouk, Tunisia, he advanced alone across open terrain despite intense hostile fire and began firing on the enemy with his machine gun. After being wounded, he continued to fire until receiving a second, fatal, wound. For these actions, he was posthumously awarded the Medal of Honor a year later, on April 25, 1944.

Booker, aged 22 at his death, was buried at Rose Hill Cemetery in his hometown of Callaway, Nebraska.

Medal of Honor citation
Private Booker's official Medal of Honor citation reads:
For conspicuous gallantry and intrepidity at risk of life above and beyond the call of duty in action. On 9 April 1943 in the vicinity of Fondouk, Tunisia, Pvt. Booker, while engaged in action against the enemy, carried a light machinegun and a box of ammunition over 200 yards of open ground. He continued to advance despite the fact that 2 enemy machineguns and several mortars were using him as an individual target. Although enemy artillery also began to register on him, upon reaching his objective he immediately commenced firing. After being wounded he silenced 1 enemy machinegun and was beginning to fire at the other when he received a second mortal wound. With his last remaining strength he encouraged the members of his squad and directed their fire. Pvt. Booker acted without regard for his own safety. His initiative and courage against insurmountable odds are an example of the highest standard of self-sacrifice and fidelity to duty.

See also

List of Medal of Honor recipients
List of Medal of Honor recipients for World War II

References

1920 births
1943 deaths
United States Army personnel killed in World War II
United States Army Medal of Honor recipients
People from Custer County, Nebraska
United States Army soldiers
World War II recipients of the Medal of Honor